Mark Lambert (born January 19, 1952) is an American actor and singer.

Early life
He was born Mark Robert Luebke and grew up in San Jose, California, where he graduated from Oak Grove High School in 1970. He was discovered by a Hollywood manager while appearing at the San Jose Community Theatre.

Career
After moving to Los Angeles, Lambert made a single episode appearance of Room 222. He went on to guest star in a variety of television shows, including The Mod Squad, The Partridge Family, and Ironside. He made his Broadway-theatre début in New York City originating the role of Henrik Egerman in the musical-theatre production of A Little Night Music (1973–74) with music and lyrics by Stephen Sondheim and book by Hugh Wheeler. After Night Music closed, Lambert moved back to California and appeared in feature films and television productions.

He dubbed the singing voice for "Tomorrow Belongs to Me" in Cabaret (1972), although the screen role was played by Oliver Collignon, a young German extra; both Lambert and Collignon were uncredited.

Personal life
Lambert married actress Victoria Mallory in 1975; they remained together until her death from cancer in 2014. The couple had a daughter, Ramona Mallory Lambert, also an actress, known professionally as Ramona Mallory.

Filmography

Film

Television

References

External links
 

1952 births
Place of birth missing (living people)
American male stage actors
American male musical theatre actors
American male voice actors
Living people
Male actors from San Jose, California